Kallista Field (born 7 July 1978) is a New Zealand equestrian. She competed in the individual dressage event at the 2000 Summer Olympics.

References

External links
 

1978 births
Living people
New Zealand female equestrians
Olympic equestrians of New Zealand
New Zealand dressage riders
Equestrians at the 2000 Summer Olympics
People from Pahiatua